Martin Velits (born 21 February 1985 in Bratislava) is a Slovakian former road bicycle racer, who rode professionally between 2007 and 2017 for the Wiesenhof,  and  teams. His twin brother, Peter Velits, also competed as a professional cyclist.

In October 2017, one year after his brother's retirement, Martin Velits announced that he would retire after competing in that year's inaugural Tour of Guangxi.

Major results

2003
 1st  Overall Grand Prix Rüebliland
 9th Overall Internationale Junioren-Rundfahrt Niedersachsen 
1st Stage 3
2004
 1st  Road race, National Under-23 Road Championships
2005
 1st  Road race, National Under-23 Road Championships
 1st Stage 3a Giro del Capo
 7th Overall Okolo Slovenska
1st  Young rider classification
2006
 1st  Road race, National Under-23 Road Championships
 1st 947 Cycle Challenge
 7th Overall Giro del Capo
 8th Overall Tour of Japan
 9th Trofeo Banca Popolare di Vicenza
 9th Memorial Philippe Van Coningsloo
 10th GP Hydraulika Mikolasek
2007
 10th Overall Ster Elektrotoer
2008
 8th Overall Driedaagse van West-Vlaanderen
2009
 1st  Road race, National Road Championships
 4th Overall Vuelta a Andalucía
2010
 1st  Time trial, National Road Championships
 1st Stage 1 (TTT) Vuelta a España
 8th Overall Tour of Oman
2012
 2nd Time trial, National Road Championships
2013
 1st Stage 1 (TTT) Tirreno–Adriatico

Grand Tour general classification results timeline

References

External links

Palmares on Cycling Base (French)

Slovak male cyclists
1985 births
Living people
Sportspeople from Bratislava
Slovak twins
Twin sportspeople